Hell's Half Acre is a large scarp located about  west of Casper, Wyoming on US 20/26. Encompassing , this geologic oddity is composed of deep ravines, caves, rock formations and hard-packed eroded earth. Hell's Half Acre was used as the location for the fictional planet of Klendathu in the movie Starship Troopers.

The location was known as "The Devil's Kitchen", "The Pits of Hades", and "The Baby Grand Canyon" until a cowhand appeared and thought he was at Hell's Half Acre, an area southwest of Casper full of alkali and bogs.

Native American tribes used the ravines to drive bison to their death during their hunts.

, the roadside restaurant and motel/campground sitting atop the ravine were closed. The motel and the abandoned restaurant have since been torn down.  The area is fenced off and there is no public access to the cliff edge nor the valley itself, but there is an interpretive sign west of the former restaurant.
As of July, 2021, the fencing was still in place, but two gates in the fence were open, allowing vehicular access to a large gravel lot (with potholes) and a closer view of the topography.

References

Landforms of Natrona County, Wyoming
Roadside attractions in Wyoming
Tourist attractions in Natrona County, Wyoming
Buffalo jumps
Escarpments of the United States
Badlands of the United States